Cretotabanus is a genus of horse flies in the family Tabanidae.

Species
Cretotabanus cretatus (Fairchild, 1961)
Cretotabanus newjerseyensis Grimaldi, 2011

References

Tabanidae
Diptera of North America
Diptera of South America
Taxa named by Graham Fairchild
Brachycera genera